The discography of American rock group Bloodhound Gang consists of five studio albums, two compilation albums, one video album, two extended plays, 14 singles and 11 music videos.

Albums

Studio albums

Compilation albums

Video albums

Demos

Extended plays

Singles

Other songs
”It's Tricky” (1996) - a Run-D.M.C. cover originally from the album One Fierce Beer Coaster, later released on the album Take a Bite Outta Rhyme: A Rock Tribute to Rap
”Jackass” (2001) (Originally written for an aborted Jackass television soundtrack, finally released on the soundtrack to the film American Pie 2, also appears on the soundtrack to Jay and Silent Bob Strike Back and the British pressings of Hefty Fine

Music videos

References

Rap rock discographies
Discography
Discographies of American artists